Lalla Fatima bint Suleiman, was one of the wives of Sultan Mohammed ben Abdallah (r. 1757–1790), and the mother of Sultan Moulay Hisham (r. 1792 – 1797).

Life 
Princess Lalla Fatima was born to Moulay Suleiman, who is either a son of Moulay Ismail or a son of Moulay Rachid. Her mother's identity is not recorded. In the 1740s she married her cousin the then prince Sidi Mohammed ben Abdallah, she was his first wife. During his reign she was known as Mulat'ud'Dar (The Lady of the House). By her high birth and personal merit she enjoyed a very high ascendancy over the mind of Sidi Mohammed III and was one of his favorite wives. This ensured her also the attachment and veneration of the people, she having with the outmost prudence attended to the government of Morocco, when the monarch was absent.

She intervened before Infanta Luisa of Spain for the release of two Moroccan women galley prisoners in Spain in exchange for Christian female captives imprisoned in Morocco. The two royal women were friends and had already conversed in the past. William Lempriere who met Lalla Fatima in 1789 for a medical consultation upon her request, described her as a perfect Moorish beauty. With round and prominent cheeks blushed in deep red, small black eyes and a face completely guiltless of expression. During her consultation she requested him to be seated close by her side and to feel her pulse as she complained of a slight cold.

The regret of the empire, at her death, was equal to her merit and her virtues, she was widowed of her husband and died after him.

References 

Spouses of sultans
18th-century Moroccan women
Moroccan princesses
'Alawi dynasty
Moroccan letter writers